Tyne Valley-Sherbrooke is a provincial electoral district for the Legislative Assembly of Prince Edward Island, Canada. The district was contested for the first time in the 2019 Prince Edward Island general election, and was created from a portion of the former district of Tyne Valley-Linkletter.

Members
The riding has elected the following Members of the Legislative Assembly:

Election results

Tyne Valley-Sherbrooke, 2019–present

References

Prince Edward Island provincial electoral districts